Vi drar till fjällen (Swedish for "We're headin' for the mountains") is a song written by Daniel Bäckström, Stefan Enberg. Marko Kristian Lehtosalo and Hans Schumacher, released as a single on 1 March 1998. The song also appeared on Markoolio's debut studio album "Sticker hårt", released later in 1998. The single topped the Swedish singles chart on 18 February 1999. It also received a Svensktoppen test on 27 February 1999 but failed to enter the chart. Elise and Jemma Myrberg are also featured in the song.

Charts

Weekly charts

Year-end charts

References 

1998 singles
Markoolio songs
Number-one singles in Sweden
Swedish-language songs